Uruguay sent a team of 21 athletes to compete in the 2011 Summer Universiade held in Shenzhen, China from August 12 to August 23, 2011.

Football

Uruguay has qualified a men's team in the football competition.

Each nation must submit a squad of 20 players, with a minimum of two goalkeepers. The following is the Uruguay squad in the men's football tournament of the 2011 Summer Universiade:

Coach:  Ramon Antoría

|-----
! colspan="9" bgcolor="#B0D3FB" align="left" |
|----- bgcolor="#DFEDFD"

|-----
! colspan="9" bgcolor="#B0D3FB" align="left" |
|----- bgcolor="#DFEDFD"

|-----
! colspan="9" bgcolor="#B0D3FB" align="left" |
|----- bgcolor="#DFEDFD"

Group C

Quarterfinals

Classification 5th-8th Place

5th Place Match

Swimming

References

2011 in Uruguayan sport
Nations at the 2011 Summer Universiade
2011